Leesville is an unincorporated community in Campbell County, in the U. S. state of Virginia.

Geography 
The town of Leesville is situated at the confluence of Goose Creek and the Staunton River, just below the lower dam of Leesville Lake.

History 
The town used to be a thriving regional hub in the late 19h century, having its own train station, post office, stores, and even a hotel. It's heyday was short-lived however as the automobile largely replaced train travel and the rail stop was relocated to "Lynch's", becoming Lynch Station, and then later relocated to Altavista, Virginia.

Mount Airy was listed on the National Register of Historic Places in 1990.

Leesville was the birthplace of baseball player Cloy Mattox.

References

Unincorporated communities in Virginia
Unincorporated communities in Campbell County, Virginia